The Blue Bonnet is a 1919 American silent drama film directed by Louis Chaudet and starring Billie Rhodes, Ben F. Wilson, and Irene Rich.

Cast
 Billie Rhodes as Ruth 
 Ben F. Wilson as Jairus Drake 
 Irene Rich as Martha Drake 
 Stanhope Wheatcroft as Sidney Haviland 
 William A. Carroll as Caleb Fry 
 Scott R. Beal as Danny 
 Charlotte Merriam as Selma 
 Lloyd Bacon as Jan Peterson

References

Bibliography
 Ken Wlaschin. The Silent Cinema in Song, 1896-1929: An Illustrated History and Catalog of Songs Inspired by the Movies and Stars, with a List of Recordings. McFarland & Company, 2009.

External links

1919 films
1919 drama films
Silent American drama films
Films directed by Louis Chaudet
American silent feature films
1910s English-language films
Pathé Exchange films
American black-and-white films
Films distributed by W. W. Hodkinson Corporation
1910s American films